Dave Hildenbrand (born November 15, 1973) is a former politician from the U.S. state of Michigan. He was a Republican member of the Michigan Senate, representing the 29th district and serving as Assistant Majority Leader. Prior to that, he was a member of the Michigan House of Representatives.

Biography

Early life and education
Hildenbrand was born in Grand Rapids, Michigan, and graduated from Lowell High School. He earned a bachelor of science degree in public resource management from Michigan State University.

Career
In 2004, he was elected to the Michigan House of Representatives, representing district 86, and was re-elected twice. He was elected to the Michigan Senate in 2010, serving through 2018, when he was required to retire by term limits. He subsequently joined the Kelley Cawthorne lobbying firm.

References

Living people
Republican Party Michigan state senators
Michigan State University alumni
1973 births
21st-century American politicians